Alberto della Scala may refer to:

Alberto I della Scala (died 1301)
Alberto II della Scala (1306–1352)